The NWA Shockwave Tag Team Championship was a professional wrestling tag team championship in NWA Shockwave (NWA-SW) and the National Wrestling Alliance (NWA). It was the original title of the CyberSpace Wrestling Federation promotion and was later recognized by the NWA as a regional title. It was introduced as the CSWF Tag Team Championship on October 19, 2002. It was established as an NWA heavyweight championship in 2005 following the promotion's admission into the NWA. The promotion became NWA: Cyberspace, and later NWA Shockwave, with the title remaining active until its retirement in 2006.

The inaugural champions were The Equalizers (Aaron Morrison and Antonio Thomas), who defeated The Soul Brothers (Elvin and Jack Soul) and The Hardcore Mafia (Bruno and Joey Davino) in a three way match on October 19, 2002 to become the first CSWF Tag Team Champions. There were 10 officially recognized champions, however no team held the belt more than once. Several then current tag teams from Total Non-Stop Action held the title during its 5-year history America's Most Wanted (Chris Harris and James Storm), The United Nations (Prince Nana and Sonjay Dutt) and The S.A.T. (Jose and Joel Maximo). At 350 days, The United Nations were the longest reigning champions in the title's history.

Title history

Names

Reigns

Combined reigns

Footnotes

See also
List of National Wrestling Alliance championships

References

External links
NWA Shockwave on Myspace
NWA Cyberspace on Myspace
CSWF.com
CSWOL.com

NWA Shockwave championships
Tag team wrestling championships
National Wrestling Alliance championships